Festus Mbewe (born 1 June 1988) is a Zambian professional footballer who currently plays as a forward for Nkana F.C.

External links 
 
 

1988 births
Living people
Zambian footballers
Zambia international footballers
Lamontville Golden Arrows F.C. players
Nkana F.C. players
Association football forwards
Sportspeople from Lusaka